Vaceuchelus clathratus is a species of sea snail, a marine gastropod mollusk in the family Chilodontidae.

Description
The height of the shell attains 6½ mm. The dull white, imperforate shell has an ovate-conic, subventricose shape. The apex is rather obtuse. The shell is ornamented with strong spiral subnodose ribs, decussated by elevated rib-striae cutting the interstices into square pits, of which there are 3 or 4 series on the third whorl, 4 on the penultimate, and 7 on the last ; The five, rounded whorls are separated by a deep, subcanaliculate suture. The rounded, almost pearly aperture is oblique. The outer lip is duplicate. Its edge is acute, crenulated, and sulcate inside. The simple columella is vertical.

Distribution
This marine species occurs in the Indo-West Pacific; off the Philippines, New Caledonia and Australia (Northern Territory, Queensland, Western Australia)

References

External links
 Adams, A. (1853). Contributions towards a monograph of the Trochidae, a family of gasteropodous Mollusca. Proceedings of the Zoological Society of London. (1851) 19: 150-192
 To Encyclopedia of Life
 To World Register of Marine Species

clathratus
Gastropods described in 1853